Nataliya Ihorivna Buksa (born November 6, 1996) is a Ukrainian chess player.

Career
She won the Girls' World Junior Chess Championship in 2015. By doing so she became a Woman Grandmaster (WGM), and qualified for the Women's World Chess Championship 2017.

Nataliya Buksa won the Women's Ukrainian Chess Championship in 2018 in Kyiv.

In 2018, she was awarded the International Master (IM) title by FIDE.

She is ranked 5th best female player in Ukraine, and her highest rating was 2437 (in September 2018).

Personal life
Buksa is married to Azerbaijani chess grandmaster Rauf Mamedov.

References

External links 
 
 
 Nataliya Buksa profile at Grandcoach.com

1996 births
Living people
Ukrainian female chess players
Chess woman grandmasters